Follicular helper T cells (also known as follicular B helper T cells and abbreviated as TFH), are antigen-experienced CD4+ T cells found in the periphery within B cell follicles of secondary lymphoid organs such as lymph nodes, spleen and Peyer's patches, and are identified by their constitutive expression of the B cell follicle homing receptor CXCR5.  Upon cellular interaction and cross-signaling with their cognate follicular (Fo B) B cells, TFH cells trigger the formation and maintenance of germinal centers through the expression of CD40 ligand (CD40L) and the secretion of IL-21 and IL-4.  TFH cells also migrate from T cell zones into these seeded germinal centers, predominantly composed of rapidly dividing B cells mutating their Ig genes. Within germinal centers, TFH cells play a critical role in mediating the selection and survival of B cells that go on to differentiate either into long-lived plasma cells capable of producing high affinity antibodies against foreign antigen, or germinal center-dependent memory B cells capable of quick immune re-activation in the future if ever the same antigen is re-encountered. TFH cells are also thought to facilitate negative selection of potentially autoimmune-causing mutated B cells in the germinal center. However, the biomechanisms by which TFH cells mediate germinal center tolerance are yet to be fully understood.

It is possible that TFH cells might arise as branches in the Th1 and Th2 differentiation pathways but their precise lineage relationship to the other effector CD4+ T cell subsets is still uncertain.  Studies have however shown that TFH have distinct gene expression profiles, supporting the theory that TFH are a subset of CD4+ T cells distinct from Th-1, Th-2, Th-17 or Tregs.

Biomolecular characterization 
The inducible T-cell co-stimulator (CD278 or ICOS) is proven to provide a particularly critical signal for TFH cells since experimental mice deficient in ICOS are unable to develop any TFH. Additionally, it has been shown that ICOS induces the secretion of IL-21 cytokine by activated CD4+ T cells and that IL-21 plays a crucial role in the development of TFH cells and germinal centers.  Also Bcl-6 is a transcription factor identified in TFH cells, but it may have roles that extend beyond this subset, because it has also been implicated in memory CD8+ T cell development.

In germinal centers, antigen-experienced TFH cells rapidly upregulate the expression of CD40L, which binds and stimulates the B cell surface receptor CD40. TFH cell-dependent paracrine activation of B cell CD40 results in B cell survival and differentiation, including the induction of AID (activation-induced (cytidine) deaminase). AID expression (encoded by the AICDA gene) causes B cell antibodies to class switch from IgM/IgD to other antibody isotypes and drives somatic hypermutation during clonal proliferation. The switched antibodies acquire better effector functions, and hypermutated antibody shows greater affinity for antigen.

Classes of TFH cells 
TFH cells formed early in the nascent stages of a germinal center reaction are formally called pre-TFH cells. They are uniquely found predominantly at the border of the T cell zone that merges with the B cell follicles and germinal centers. Pre-TFH cells are functionally very similar to other TFH cells in facilitating germinal center B cell reactions however, in addition, they are also capable of driving follicular B cell development adjacent to and outside of germinal centers to produce quickly responsive but non-durable plasma cell-driven antibody responses (known as the extrafollicular response).

Those TFH cells specifically residing within a mature germinal center are sometimes referred to as GC TFH cells (for Germinal Center TFH cells) to distinguish them from pre-TFH cells. There is also a minor sub-class within this population of GC Tfh cells that express the gene Foxp3, encoding for a transcription factor. This small discrete sub-population of cells, called TFR cells (for T Follicular Regulatory cells), are important in helping to control and limit the magnitude of normal germinal center responses such that they avoid the potential to produce abnormally mutated or self-reactive autoimmune-associated antibodies. Therefore, TFR cells are a uniquely inhibitory influence during a germinal center reaction.

While TFH cells are found primarily in the secondary lymphoid organs, a small proportion circulate in the blood and are termed "peripheral" T follicular helper cells (pTFH). These cells can be identified by their expression of IL-21 upon stimulation.

Medical relevance

Generating lasting immune memory
TFH cells are considered an indispensable T cell subset in the generation and maintenance of germinal center responses. Therefore, in the absence of TFH cells, similar to B cell activation by T-cell independent antigens, a quick burst of low affinity plasma cell production is formed but this does not lead to germinal center induction nor permit antibody affinity maturation or the differentiation of effective memory B cells which are essential in fortifying the body against subsequent infections. Specifically, germinal center-dependent memory B cells are the drivers of recall antibody production during a secondary immune response. Therefore, the proper activation and development of TFH cells is central to the efficacy of immunizations and vaccine design for the induction of long-term immunity. In a Bangladeshi population study of patients infected with Vibrio cholerae and healthy human volunteers administered with an existing cholera vaccine, a memory TFH response specifically against cholera antigen had correlated with further antibody production by B cells.

Controlling age-related immune decline
With normal aging comes a gradual diminishing of the body's immune system. This phenomenon called immunosenescence is largely due to a decline of T cell function, including the capacity for TFH cells to properly support germinal center responses. This may be in part due to lower CD40L levels on the cell surface of TFH cells in the aged.

Avoiding autoimmunity
Unchecked or overactive TFH cell immune responses have the potential to mount unwarranted germinal centers, composed of aberrantly mutated B cells that can drive antibody-mediated autoimmune diseases. Elevated levels of TFH-like cells can be detected in the blood of a subset of human patients with systemic lupus erythematosus (SLE) and Sjögren syndrome. However, scientific evidence suggesting TFH cells can definitively cause autoimmunity in humans remains incomplete.

References

T cells